The Canadian Institute of Mining, Metallurgy and Petroleum (CIM) is a not-for-profit technical society of professionals in the Canadian minerals, metals, materials and energy industries. CIM's  members are convened from industry, academia and government.

History
In March 1898, the Canadian Mining Institute was founded in Montreal at the second annual meeting of the Federated Canadian Mining Institute, which was dissolved. The Institute was incorporated by an Act of Parliament to include all former provincial groups except The Mining Society of Nova Scotia, which remained a separate body.

In 1902, The Institute formed its first Branches in Sherbrooke, Quebec, Kingston, Ontario, and Nelson, British Columbia. In 1918, the Mining Society of Nova Scotia formally became affiliated with the Canadian Mining Institute 

In 1920, Metallurgy was added to the name to recognize the inclusion of this discipline.

In 1942, the Institute made CIM its official abbreviation.

In 1990, "Canadian Institute of Mining, Metallurgy and Petroleum" became the official name of the Institute by an Act of Parliament.

In 1996, CIM published its Guidelines for the Estimation, Classification and Reporting of Resources and Reserves. This document became an integral part of National Instrument 43-101 (NI 43-101), the set of rules for reporting and displaying information from mineral properties owned by companies listed on Canadian exchanges that came into effect on Feb. 1, 2001.

1998 was CIM's Centennial Year. A book entitled "Pride and Vision" by E. Tina Crossfield was published in commemoration of the event.

In 2018, CIM celebrated its 120th anniversary. It also launched a new  a completely redesigned site for all of its Standards, Best Practices & Guidance for Mineral Resources & Mineral Reserves materials, including the 2014 update of CIM Definition Standards.

Publications
 CIM Magazine, a mineral industry publication for information on technology and operations, published 8 times a year.
 CIM Journal,  quarterly digital publication for peer-reviewed technical papers. Papers cover all facets of the mining and minerals industry, including geology, mining, processing, maintenance, environmental protection and reclamation, mineral economics and project management. CIM Journal publishes papers in either English or French, with abstracts provided in both languages.
 Canadian Metallurgical Quarterly, the CMQ provides a forum for the discussion and the presentation of both basic and applied research developments in the area of metallurgy and materials
 Exploration and Mining Geology Journal, the Geological Society's own quarterly journal for the publication of Canadian and international papers on applied aspects of mineral exploration and exploitation. (As of 2013, this journal is no longer being published.) See https://www.cim.org/en/Societies-and-Branches/Societies/Geological-Society/Exploration-and-Mining-Geology-Journal.aspx
 Various books, covering topics from all facets of the mining, minerals and materials industries.

Branches
CIM Branches are organized geographically within three Districts (Western, Central and Eastern) across Canada to address the local needs of members. They discuss regional issues concerning the industry and undertake CIM’s mission at a local level.

Canadian Branches by District

Western District

 Calgary 
 Crowsnest 
 Edmonton 
 North Central BC  
 Oil Sands  
 Saskatoon  
 Saskatoon GeoSection  
 South Central BC  
 Vancouver

Central District

 GTA West 
 Hamilton  
 Northern Gateway  
 Ottawa  
 Porcupine  
 Red Lake  
 Sudbury  
 Sudbury  
 GeoSection  
 Thunder Bay  
 Toronto

Eastern District

 Amos  
 Chapais-Chibougamau  
 Montréal  
 New Brunswick  
 Newfoundland and Labrador  
 Québec  
 Rouyn-Noranda  
 Saguenay  
 Thetford Mines  
 Val d'Or

International

 Lima-Peru

Technical Societies
CIM’s 10 technical societies strive to promote the development of the many facets of Canada’s minerals, metals, materials and petroleum industries. Technically driven, they come together to discuss issues of concern in their specific field pertaining to the discovery, production and utilization of resources.

Canadian Mineral Processors Society 

Environmental and Social Responsibility Society 

Geological Society 

Maintenance, Engineering and Reliability Society

Management & Economics Society 

Metallurgy and Materials Society

Mining Society of Nova Scotia 

Society for Rock Engineering 

Surface Mining Society

Underground Mining Society

Awards of Excellence
The institute bestows several awards annually to individuals for their outstanding achievements and contributions to their respective fields and to the mining and minerals industries in general.

Branch and Society Awards
CIM District Distinguished Service Medal
Barlow Medal for Best Geological Paper
Julian Boldy Memorial Award 
Robert Elver Mineral Economics Award
McParland Memorial Award for Excellence in Maintenance, Engineering and Reliability 
Mining Engineering for Outstanding Achievement Award 
Mel W. Bartley Outstanding Branch Award

Early Career Awards
CIM-Bedford Canadian Young Mining Leader Award
CIM Presidents' Role Model Medal

Exploration Awards
A.O. Dufresne Award
J.C. Sproule Award

Sustainability Awards
Award for Excellence in Sustainable Development
TSM Community Engagement Excellence Award
TSM Environmental Excellence Award

Safety Awards
Hatch-CIM Mining & Minerals Project Development Safety Award
John T. Ryan Safety Trophies
Mining Safety Leadership Medal Award
 
Career Excellence Awards
CIM Fellowship
CIM Distinguished Service Medal
Selwyn G. Blaylock Medal
Vale Medal for Meritorious Contributions to Mining

Social Responsibility and Education Awards
CIM Distinguished Lecturer
CIM Community Service Award
Diversity and Inclusion Award

References

External links
 CIM Official website
 CIM Standards, Best Practices and Guidance for Mineral Resources and Mineral Reserves
 CIM Technical Paper Library

 
1898 establishments in Quebec
Scientific organizations based in Canada
Engineering societies based in Canada
Energy in Canada